Ebbey Abraham (born 1 June 1980), better known by his stage name Vysakh, is an Indian film director who works in Malayalam films. He began his career as a television anchor and later as an associate director to Joshiy and Johny Antony. He debuted as an independent director in 2010 with Pokkiri Raja starring Mammootty and Prithviraj Sukumaran. In 2016, his directorial Pulimurugan starring Mohanlal and Jagapathi Babu became one of the first Malayalam film to gross around  crore at the box office.

Early life
Ebbey Abraham was born in 1980 at Kalliot, Kanhangad, Kasaragod district, as the son of K. C. Abraham and Mariyamma Abraham.

Career
He took the name Vysakh for anchoring the television show Ponpulari aired on Surya TV. Later he began working as an associate director to Johny Antony in films such as CID Moosa, Kochi Rajavu, Thuruppugulan and Inspector Garud. He worked with Joshiy for Naran, Twenty:20 and Robin Hood. 

He debuted as an independent director in 2010 through the action masala film Pokkiri Raja starring Mammootty and Prithviraj. It grossed ₹25 crore and became the top grosser of the year 2010 in Malayalam. 
His next venture was the comedy thriller Seniors starring Jayaram, Kunchacko Boban, Biju Menon, and Manoj K. Jayan. 
His third film was Mallu Singh in 2012. All the three films were commercial success at the box office. He also wrote the screenplay for the drama film Vishudhan.

In 2016, Pulimurugan with Mohanlal and Jagapathi Babu in the lead role became the highest-grossing Malayalam film ever and the first film to gross 100 and 150 crore at the box office in Malayalam film history. His following film was Madhura Raja (2019) with Mammootty,Jagapathi Babu a spin-off of Pokkiri Raja. Madhura Raja got mixed to positive reviews and grossed more than 100 crore worldwide. He has announced a number of films after that with the same actors.

On 2022, he directed Night Drive starring Indrajith Sukumaran, Anna Ben and Roshan Mathew in lead roles. He also directed the  Mohanlal starrer 'Monster which received mixed to negative reviews and heavily panned by the critics and the audience alike.

His upcoming films are Bruce Lee starring Unni Mukundan and New York starring Mammootty. Both are slated to release in 2023.

Personal life
He married Neena from Udayapuram, Kanhangad, Kerala, a nurse on 12 November 2007. They have two children.

 Filmography 

 Director 

 Producer 

 Ira Assistant Director 
Television
 Kadamattathu Kathanar (Television series)

FilmC.I.D. MoosaNaran Kochi Rajavu 
 Thuruppugulan Inspector Garud''
 Twenty:20
 Bhagavan
 Robin Hood

References

Malayalam film directors
People from Kasaragod district
Living people
Malayalam screenwriters
Film directors from Kerala
21st-century Indian film directors
Screenwriters from Kerala
1980 births